Fortress is a tower defense strategy video game developed by Pipe Dream Interactive and published by Majesco Entertainment for the Game Boy Advance (GBA) handheld game console.

Gameplay

Development
Fortress was originally announced in June 2000 as a PlayStation and Dreamcast game under development by Promethean Designs with the title "Fortris". In January 2001, Majesco Entertainment announced that it had acquired the game, then titled "Fortres", alongside nine other titles for release on the GBA. The game was given a final name change the following month. Development moved from Promethean Designs to Pipe Dream Interactive, Majesco's internal developer. Majesco announced in July 2001 that Fortress was to be published in PAL regions by THQ as part of an international publishing deal between the two corporations.

Reception

IGN stated that the game "seems very unfinished", and "does have a lot of very clever ideas", saying that it would have been a much better game if the developers took more time.

References

2001 video games
Cancelled Dreamcast games
Cancelled PlayStation (console) games
Game Boy Advance games
Game Boy Advance-only games
Majesco Entertainment games
Tower defense video games
Multiplayer and single-player video games
Video games developed in the United States
Pipe Dream Interactive games